Covfefe is a word used on Twitter by Donald Trump.

Covfefe may also refer to:
 COVFEFE Act, a bill introduced by the United States House of Representatives 
 Covfefe (horse), a retired American racehorse